Willem "Willie" Christiaan Botha (31 March 1912 – 14 June 1967) was a South African athlete who competed in the 1936 Summer Olympics. He was born in Petrusburg.

In 1936 he was eliminated in the first round of the 800 metres event. He was also a member of the South African team which was eliminated in the first round of the 4x400 metre relay competition.

At the 1934 Empire Games he won the silver medal in the 880 yards contest. He also participated in the 440 yards event but was eliminated in the heats.

External links
Willie Botha's profile at Sports Reference.com
Willie Botha's grave

1912 births
1967 deaths
People from Letsemeng Local Municipality
Afrikaner people
South African male sprinters
Olympic athletes of South Africa
Athletes (track and field) at the 1936 Summer Olympics
Athletes (track and field) at the 1934 British Empire Games
Commonwealth Games silver medallists for South Africa
Commonwealth Games medallists in athletics
Medallists at the 1934 British Empire Games